is a district of Nerima, Tokyo, Japan. The current administrative place names are Asahigaoka 1-chome and 2-chome.

Education
Nerima City Board of Education operates public elementary and junior high schools.

Asahigaoka is zoned to Asahigaoka Elementary School (旭丘小学校), and Asahigaoka Junior High School (練馬区立旭丘中学校).

References

External links

Districts of Nerima